Metacantharis clypeata is a species of soldier beetle belonging to the family Cantharidae.

Etymology
The Latin genus name Metacantharis is composed by meta (meaning middle) and Cantharis (other genus of Soldier beetles), while the Latin species name clypeata means distinguished by the clypeus.

Description
Elytrae are pale yellowish or pale brownish, with a dark suture and sparse short semi-erect pubescence. The head is black to the front of the eyes. Pronotum shows a basic yellow color with two black spots often merged and located on the rear half. Scutellum is black. These soldier beetles occur from April to July, mostly on pines and oaks.

Habitat
Metacantharis clypeata lives in lowland and upland areas up to an altitude of about 1900 m above sea level. It is a xerophilous species, may be a relic of the cold and dry climate of the late Pleistocene and early Holocene.

Distribution
This species can be found in Albania, Great Britain, Bulgaria, Czech Republic, France, Germany, Greece, Italy, Hungary, Lithuania, Poland, Russia, Slovakia, Spain, Switzerland, eastern Palaearctic realm, and North Africa.

References

External links
 Meloidae

Beetles of Europe
Metacantharis
Beetles described in 1798